Susanna Clara Elisabeth "Mini" Andén (born 7 June 1978) is a Swedish model, actress, occasional host and producer.

Biography
She was born in Stockholm and began modeling at the age of ten, joining Elite Model Management when she was fifteen. She has been on the cover of many fashion magazines including Vogue, Marie Claire, Cosmopolitan, and ELLE. She has been featured in  fashion campaigns for Calvin Klein, Donna Karan, BCBG, Louis Vuitton, Hugo Boss, Gucci, and  Victoria's Secret.  She is currently seen as the face for Giorgio Armani's perfume Armani Code for Women.

She was a judge in the Miss Universe beauty pageant in 2001. She was the host of the Swedish section of Scandinavia's Next Top Model which premiered February 16, 2005. Andén has appeared in a handful of films and produced the 2003 short film  Buffoon, which starred her husband Taber Schroeder.  She appeared in MyNetworkTV's Fashion House in which she played a self-destructive model Tania Ford. 

She married model Taber Schroeder in 2001, and they live together in Los Angeles.

Agencies 
Don Buchwald and Associates/Fortitude - Theatrical Agents/Los Angeles-New York
Elite Model Management - New York
Marilyn Agency - Paris
Mikas - Stockholm
Model Management- Hamburg
Traffic Models - Barcelona

Filmography

Film

Television

References

External links 

1978 births
Living people
Actresses from Stockholm
Swedish television actresses
Swedish film actresses
Swedish socialites
Swedish female models